Lecques is a commune in the Gard department in southern France.

It is built on rising ground, on the west bank of the River Vidourle,  to the north and upstream of Sommières. The village centre is on a rocky outcrop that overhangs the bank of the river.  Steps lead down to the bridge. Its elevation means it is protected from the 'vidourlades' or violent floods, for example, that of 9 September 2002. There are remains of the ramparts, the narrow medieval streets and a church.

Etymology
The name 'Lecques' comes from the Celtic word 'leucas', meaning a settlement by a marker post on an ancient track.

Population

See also
Communes of the Gard department

References

Communes of Gard